Rouvray-Saint-Denis is a commune in the Eure-et-Loir department in northern France.

History
It has long been thought that it was the site of the Battle of the Herrings in 1429, when Sir John Fastolf beat off an attack on an English convoy taking supplies to the siege of Orléans; but in his biography of Fastolf, The Real Falstaff, Stephen Cooper argues that the battle is more likely to have taken place at Rouvray-Sainte-Croix.

Population

See also
Communes of the Eure-et-Loir department

References

Communes of Eure-et-Loir